Woodcote High School is a secondary school with academy status located in the Coulsdon area of the London Borough of Croydon, England.

Woodcote is a coeducational school, of around 1200 students. The school gained Specialist Sports College and Mathematics and Computing College status.

Ofsted
In an Ofsted inspection in 2015 the school was given an overall grade 2 (good) with individual grades being awarded as grade 2 in all areas. The school maintained its standing of "Good" in a 2018 short inspection.

Track Coulsdon
In cooperation with South London Harriers an 8-lane all-weather running track has been built at the school. It includes a full size football pitch.

South London Harriers have a 100-year agreement with Woodcote High School which began in 2012 to use and jointly manage the Track Coulsdon facility. The area of land on which the track is built is protected from development for 100 years until 2113 by an agreement with the QEII Fields in Trust.

Notable alumni

 Steve Sidwell
 Jack Hingert
 Stefan O'Connor
Lee Brown
Raye
Alex Tapp  
Tino Livramento  
Wesley Fonguck  
Ali Koiki  
Myles Kenlock  
Leon McKenzie

References

Secondary schools in the London Borough of Croydon
Academies in the London Borough of Croydon